Group D of the 2010 FIFA World Cup began on 13 June and ended on 23 June 2010. The group consisted of Germany, Australia, Serbia and Ghana. Along with Group G, it was considered to be a group of death.

Standings

Germany advanced to play England (runners-up of Group C) in the round of 16.
Ghana advanced to play United States (winners of Group C) in the round of 16.

Matches
All times local (UTC+2)

Serbia vs Ghana

Germany vs Australia

Germany vs Serbia
Serbia went ahead in the 38th minute with a goal from winger Milan Jovanović. In the 59th minute, Serbia centre-back Nemanja Vidić was booked for a handball in the penalty box, but the ensuing penalty kick from Lukas Podolski was saved by goalkeeper Vladimir Stojković.

Ghana vs Australia

Ghana vs Germany

Australia vs Serbia

References

Group D
Group
Australia at the 2010 FIFA World Cup
Group
Serbia at the 2010 FIFA World Cup